R-23 regional road is a Montenegrin roadway.

History

In January 2016, the Ministry of Transport and Maritime Affairs published bylaw on categorisation of state roads. With new categorisation, R-23 was created from several municipal roads.

Major intersections

References

R-23